Julen Lobete Cienfuegos (born 18 September 2000) is a Spanish professional footballer who plays as a left winger for Dutch club RKC Waalwijk, on loan from RC Celta de Vigo.

Club career

Real Sociedad
Born in Lezo, Gipuzkoa, Basque Country, Lobete joined Real Sociedad's youth setup in 2018, from Antiguoko. He made his senior debut with the C-team on 22 September 2018, coming on as a second-half substitute in a 0–0 Tercera División home draw against Deportivo Alavés B.

Lobete first appeared with the reserves on 7 September 2019, playing 34 minutes in a 2–0 home win over CD Guijuelo in the Segunda División B. He scored his first senior goal late in the month, netting the B's fourth goal in a 5–0 away routing of Barakaldo CF.

Lobete renewed his contract until 2023 on 4 January 2020. He was a regular starter for the B-side during the 2020–21 campaign, scoring seven goals as the side returned to Segunda División after 59 years.

Lobete made his first team – and La Liga – debut on 15 August 2021; after replacing Portu in the 65th minute, he scored his team's first in a 4–2 away loss against FC Barcelona.

Celta
On 26 July 2022, Lobete signed a four-year contract with RC Celta de Vigo in the top tier. Two days later, he was loaned to Eredivisie side RKC Waalwijk for a season.

References

External links

2000 births
Living people
People from Donostialdea
Sportspeople from Gipuzkoa
Spanish footballers
Footballers from the Basque Country (autonomous community)
Association football wingers
La Liga players
Segunda División players
Segunda División B players
Tercera División players
Antiguoko players
Real Sociedad C footballers
Real Sociedad B footballers
Real Sociedad footballers
RC Celta de Vigo players
RKC Waalwijk players
Spain under-21 international footballers
Spanish expatriate footballers
Spanish expatriate sportspeople in the Netherlands
Expatriate footballers in the Netherlands